Oklahoma's 8th congressional district is an obsolete district from Oklahoma.  It was added in 1915, and was eliminated in 1953. In its final configuration, it covered much of north-central Oklahoma, including Enid. Most of its territory was merged with the Tulsa-based Oklahoma's 1st congressional district. The last congressman from the 8th District, Page Belcher, transferred to the 1st.

List of representatives

References

 Congressional Biographical Directory of the United States 1774–present

08
Former congressional districts of the United States